Norman Grekin (June 22, 1930 – September 29, 1981) was an American professional basketball player. After playing college basketball for La Salle Explorers, he went on to play for the Philadelphia Warriors in the National Basketball Association (NBA).

Grekin was born in 1930 in Philadelphia. He didn't start playing basketball until the age of 14. After attending West Philadelphia High School, he went on to star at La Salle College from 1950 to 1953. Grekin led the Explorers to the 1952 National Invitation Tournament championship and was named co-Most Valuable Player with his teammate, Tom Gola. It was the first time the honor was shared. In 1953, Grekin received honorable mention in All-American voting from Newspaper Enterprise Association and United Press International. He left La Salle as the second-leading scorer in the school's history. He was inducted into the La Salle Hall of Athletes in 1967.

Grekin was selected in the 1953 NBA draft by the Philadelphia Warriors. He entered the Marines in September 1953, but he received a medical discharge after 10 days. He played in his only game for the Warriors on October 31, where he recorded one personal foul, before being waived in early November. According to Warriors coach Eddie Gottlieb, Grekin did not fit as a playmaker playing at guard. Following his brief NBA stint, he played two seasons in the Eastern Professional Basketball League for the Pottsville Bolognas and the Sunbury Mercuries.

Grekin died on September 29, 1981, at Bryn Mawr Hospital in Bryn Mawr, Pennsylvania. He was 51.

References

External links
 Philadelphia Jewish Sports Hall of Fame entry
 Jews in Sports entry

1930 births
1981 deaths
American men's basketball players
Basketball players from Philadelphia
Jewish men's basketball players
La Salle Explorers men's basketball players
Philadelphia Warriors draft picks
Philadelphia Warriors players
Power forwards (basketball)
Sunbury Mercuries players